Spruce are trees in the genus Picea. 

Spruce may also refer to:

Places 
In the United States:
 Spruce, Michigan, an unincorporated community
 Spruce, Dickinson County, Michigan, former train depot
 Spruce, Missouri
 Spruce, Wisconsin, a town
 Spruce (community), Wisconsin, an unincorporated community
 Spruce Township, Minnesota

People 
 Andy Spruce (born 1954), Canadian ice hockey player
 Edward Caldwell Spruce (1865-1922), English sculptor
 Everett Spruce (1908–2002), American painter
 George Spruce (1923–1998), English professional football player
 Nelson Spruce (born 1992), American football player
 Richard Spruce (1817–1893), English botanist and explorer
 Stuart Spruce (b. 1971), English rugby league player 
 Tabitha Spruce, author

Media 
 The Spruce, a website about home and food, published by Dotdash Meredith